Asa Danforth (1746-1818) was father of salt manufacturer and an early colonizer Asa Danforth Jr. Danforth was originally from Worcester, Massachusetts and moved his family to the Onondaga Valley area of New York. He was known to have anti-British sentiments.

Danforths in America

Danforth traces his roots back to surveyor Jonathan Danforth Sr (1628 - 1712) arrived in America aboard the Griffin in 1635. He was born in Framingham, High Suffolk, England and worked on surveying work in colonial America. Several generations of Danforths would reside in Massachusetts.

References 

1746 births
1818 deaths
Military personnel from Syracuse, New York
People from Brookline, Massachusetts
People from Worcester, Massachusetts